Denyer is a surname. Notable people with the surname include:

 Bertie Denyer (1893–1969), English footballer
Bertie Denyer (footballer, born 1924) (1924–2015), English footballer
Carla Denyer, English Green Party politician
 Frank Denyer (born 1943), English composer
 Grant Denyer (born 1977), Australian TV presenter and motor racing driver
 Paul Denyer (born 1972), Australian serial killer
 Peter Denyer (1947–2009), English actor
 Peter B. Denyer (1953–2010), British engineer, scientist and inventor
 Terence Denyer (born 1981), Zimbabwean cricketer

See also